Gernon Bay is an Arctic waterway in Kitikmeot Region, Nunavut, Canada. It is located on the south side of the Queen Maud Gulf off Nunavut's mainland.

Campbell Bay and Chester Bay are nearby.

The mouth of the Ellice River opens between Gernon Bay and Campbell Bay.

References

Bays of Kitikmeot Region